The name Aning was used for seven tropical cyclones in the Philippine Area of Responsibility by PAGASA in the Western Pacific Ocean.

Typhoon Pamela (1966) (T6635, 39W, Aning), Category 2 typhoon
Tropical Storm Ruth (1970) (T7026, 28W, Aning)
Typhoon Gloria (1974) (T7428, 32W, Aning), Category 4 typhoon
Typhoon Ora (1978) (T7824, 25W, Aning), Category 2 typhoon
Typhoon Pamela (1982) (T8224, 27W, Aning), crossed the Marshall Islands as a Category 3 typhoon, Guam as a tropical storm, then restrengthened to a typhoon before crossing the Philippines
Typhoon Marge (1986) (T8628, 25W, Aning), crossed the southern Philippines as a Category 2 typhoon, then dissipated in the South China Sea
Super Typhoon Orchid (1994) (T9426, 28W, Aning), struck Japan

When new sets of names were implemented in 2001, the name Aning was dropped from use.

Pacific typhoon set index articles